The 1991 UIAA Climbing World Championships, the first edition, were held in Frankfurt, Germany from 1 to 2 October 1991. It was organized by the Union Internationale des Associations d'Alpinisme (UIAA). The championships consisted of lead and speed events.

Medalists

Lead 
François Legrand and Susi Good were the first ever Lead World Champions. Legrand climbed efficiently and topped the final route.

Speed 
Hans Florine and Isabelle Dorsimond were the first ever Speed World Cup Champions.

References 

 IFSC Climbing World Championships
World Climbing Championships
International sports competitions hosted by Germany